Elte can refer to the following:

 Elte (river), a river of Germany
 Elte, North Rhine-Westphalia, former township now integrated into Rheine, Germany
 Eötvös Loránd University, a university in Budapest

People with the surname
 Harry Elte, Dutch architect
 E. L. Elte, Dutch mathematician